Putzleinsdorf is a municipality in the district of Rohrbach in Upper Austria, Austria.

References

Cities and towns in Rohrbach District